Hamlet Edwin Peterson (April 6, 1897 – October 2, 1973) was an American football, basketball, and baseball coach. He served as the head football coach at Luther College in Decorah, Iowa from 1925 to 1945. Peterson was also the head basketball coach at Luther from 1922 to 1965 and the school's baseball coach in 1967.

Peterson died October 2, 1973, at a hospital Rochester, Minnesota following treatment for cancer.

Head coaching record

Football

References

External links
 Luther College profile

1897 births
1973 deaths
Luther Norse baseball coaches
Luther Norse football coaches
Luther Norse football players
Luther Norse men's basketball coaches
College track and field coaches in the United States
People from Winnebago County, Iowa
Coaches of American football from Iowa
Players of American football from Iowa
Baseball coaches from Iowa
Basketball coaches from Iowa
Deaths from cancer in Minnesota